Gedde is a surname. Notable people with this surname include:

 Caroline Gedde-Dahl (born 1973), Norwegian alpine skier
  (1729-1798), Danish cartographer, known for Gedde's maps of Copenhagen
 Dagfinn Gedde-Dahl (1937–2016), Norwegian physician
 Dietmar Gedde (born 1936), German sailor
  (1779-1833), Danish officer
 Tobias Gedde-Dahl (1903–1994), Norwegian physician
 Walter Gedde, English designer

As given name
 Gedde Watanabe (born 1955), American actor and comedian

Fictional characters
 Malia Gedde, from Gabriel Knight